Events in the year 2011 in Portugal.

Incumbents
President: Aníbal Cavaco Silva
Prime Minister: José Sócrates

Events
January 1 - Portugal becomes a non-permanent member of the United Nations Security Council
January 23 - Portuguese presidential election, 2011
12 March - the anti-austerity movement in Portugal begins with over 300,000 people marching in Lisbon and Porto.

Arts and entertainment
Music: Portugal in the Eurovision Song Contest 2011.

Sports
Football (soccer) competitions: Primeira Liga, Liga de Honra, Taça da Liga, Taça de Portugal.

In rink hockey: CIRH U-20 World Cup.

Deaths

See also
List of Portuguese films of 2011

References

 
2010s in Portugal
Years of the 21st century in Portugal
Portugal
Portugal